Minnesota Softball is the statewide governing body of amateur softball in Minnesota and an affiliate of USA Softball. As the governing body of softball in Minnesota, it is our responsibility to regulate competition to ensure fairness and equal opportunity to the people who play our sport

Since 1925, Minnesota Softball (formerly known as Minnesota State Diamond Ball Association and Minnesota Amateur Softball Association) has been providing volunteer services for the development and promotion of youth and adult softball in Minnesota.

In 1952, Minnesota officially joined the Amateur Softball Association (ASA), and Mr. Einar Nelson of the Minneapolis Park Board was named State Commissioner. ASA has since rebranded to USA Softball on January 1, 2017, and is the national governing body of softball in the United States.

Minnesota Softball is one of 62 local state and metro associations.

History 
In 1918, William Ahern organized a City Amateur Kitten Ball association modelled on lines similar to those of the Minneapolis Amateur Baseball Association. The association was designed to include all kitten ball organizations of the city and will be composed of one representative from each league. William Ahern, who has played a prominent part in the organization of kitten ball teams both in Minneapolis and St. Paul, was elected president of the newly formed association. C.J. Hermstad was chosen vice president, with Bert Ekberg secretary-treasurer. A committee was also appointed to draw up a constitution and by-laws for the association, which will be passed upon at another meeting. The division of the leagues, size of bat and ball, and other details will be included in the articles, which will apply to all leagues. J.C. Batten and J. Poitras, make up this committee.

In 1920, new officers were elected for the season. Nick Kahler is president; William Ahern, vice president; Tom Hastings, secretary; Harold A. Johnson, treasurer.

In 1923, William Ahern was elected president of the Minneapolis Diamondball Association at the annual meeting of the organization last week. It marks the third year of service in that capacity.

In 1924, William Ahern was named Diamondball President. The Minneapolis Diamondball Association meeting was held and officers for the coming year were named. William Ahern has been elected president; C.A. Neavles, first vice president; Walter McDonald, second vice president; Conrad Thorpe, secretary; H.A. Johnson, treasurer.

In 1925, Harold A. Johnson was named Minnesota State Diamond Ball Commissioner. The Twin Cities Championship was not played this year as both city champions entered a statewide Diamondball Championship Tournament. Cook's of Duluth beat Hibbing 5 to 4 to win the Iron Range district. Then Bertch Furniture of Minneapolis beat Cook's 7-0. Greb Martonick had 17 strikeouts to win Northern States. Winona beat Faribault, then St. Francis Casinos of St. Paul beat Winona on Marty O'Connors no hitter to win Southern States. Bertch Furniture would win the championship series held between Parade and Dunning for the 1925 State Championship.

In 1926, the state diamondball championship was decided by tournament play again this year, according to announcement made today by H.A. Johnson of the park board and president of the state diamondball association. The tournament was held last year for the first time and it provided to be very successful and the state officials decided to hold the tourney again this year.

Organization

Commissioner 
The Commissioner is the principal liaison between the local Minnesota association and the USA Softball National Office in Oklahoma City. It was not until 1952 when Minnesota joined ASA.

 1925-1937 Harold A. Johnson (Minneapolis)
 1938-1946 E.W. Johnson (St. Paul)
 1947-1951 Einar Nelson (Coon Rapids)
1952-1953 Burton K. Storm (Richfield)
1954-1960 Laurenz "Larry" Harris (Hopkins)
 1959-1966 Ron Hurst (Bloomington)
 1967-1975 Bob Kojetin (Edina)
 1976 Lavern Schumack (Minneapolis)
 1977-2010 Perry Coonce (South St. Paul)
 2011–Present Dan Pfeffer (Maple Grove)

Districts 
Minnesota is divided up into eight different districts.
 District 1 consists of the following counties: Dodge, Fillmore, Freeborn, Goodhue, Houston, Mower, Olmstead, Rice, Steele, Wabasha, Winona.
 District 2 consists of the following counties: Blue Earth, Brown, Cottonwood, Faribault, Jackson, Le Sueur, Lincoln, Lyon, Martin, Murray, Nicollet, Nobles, Pipestone, Redwood, Rock, Waseca, Watonwan.
 District 3 consists of the following counties: Anoka, Dakota, Ramsey, Washington.
 District 4 consists of the following counties: Hennepin. Minneapolis is its own USA Softball recognized metro association and is operated by Minneapolis Park and Recreation.
 District 5 consists of the following counties: Carver, Scott, Wright.
 District 6 consists of the following counties: Benton, Big Stone, Chippewa, Kandiyohi, Lac Qui Parle, McLeod, Meeker, Mille Lacs, Morrison, Pope, Renville, Sherburne, Sibley, Stearns, Stevens, Swift, Todd, Traverse, Yellow Medicine.
 District 7 consists of the following counties: Aitkin, Carlton, Chisago, Cook, Crow Wing, Isanti, Itasca, Kanabec, Koochiching, Lake, Pine, St. Louis.
 District 8 consists of the following counties: Becker, Beltrami, Cass, Clay, Clearwater, Douglas, Grant, Hubbard, Kittson, Lake of the Woods, Mahnomen, Marshall, Norman, Otter Tail, Pennington, Polk, Red Lake, Roseau, Wadena, Wilkin.

Championships

National championship teams from Minnesota

Notable players

Minnesotans named to national teams

Minnesotans coaching national teams

References

External links 

 Minnesota Softball Official Site
 Minnesota Softball History History of Softball in Minnesota Site

1925 establishments in Minnesota
Softball organizations